Ambessence Piano & Drones is an ambient music album by Bruno Sanfilippo. All of the tracks on the album are untitled, however, they each share the same name as the album's name including their track number.

The composition was sampled by Canadian recording hip-hop artist Drake for his 2013 song "Started from the Bottom".

Track listing

 "Ambessence Piano & Drones 1" - 10:01
 "Ambessence Piano & Drones 2" - 6:27
 "Ambessence Piano & Drones 3" - 8:32
 "Ambessence Piano & Drones 4" - 8:36
 "Ambessence Piano & Drones 5" - 14:29
 "Ambessence Piano & Drones 6" - 7:34
 "Ambessence Piano & Drones 7" - 6:07

References

2008 albums